Amaranthe is the debut studio album by Swedish heavy metal band Amaranthe. The album was released April 11, 2011 and reached #35 and #16 on the Swedish and Finnish charts respectively. It also topped the Japanese Import charts beating Lady Gaga. A deluxe edition was released in October 2011, featuring two bonus tracks and a DVD.

Track listing

Notes
 On streaming services and digital stores, "Rain" is alternatively titled "It's All About Me".

Personnel

Amaranthe
Elize Ryd – clean vocals (female)
Jake E – clean vocals (male)
Andy Solveström – harsh vocals
Olof Mörck – guitars, keyboards, co-producer, mixing
Johan Andreassen – bass
Morten Løwe Sørensen – drums

Additional musicians
Elias Holmlid – keyboards and arrangements on "Amaranthine"
Pagaard Wolff – additional guitar on "Amaranthine"

Production
Jacob Hansen – producer, engineer, mixing, mastering
Jeppe Andersson – co-producer

Charts

Release history

References

2011 debut albums
Amaranthe albums
Spinefarm Records albums
Albums produced by Jacob Hansen